Raimondas Rumšas (born 14 January 1972) is a Lithuanian former professional road bicycle racer. He came third in the 2002 Tour de France but was implicated in a doping scandal.

Doping
On the day of Rumšas' third-place finish in the 2002 Tour de France, police discovered corticoids, erythropoietin, testosterone, growth hormones and anabolic steroids in the car of his wife, Edita Rumšienė. She was jailed for several months before being released, despite her claim that the drugs were for her mother-in-law.

In May 2003 Rumšas tested positive for the banned endurance enhancer erythropoietin (EPO). He had just finished the 2003 Giro d'Italia, where he ranked sixth. Rumšas received a one-year ban. He briefly returned to cycling in 2004 with Acqua & Sapone team for the Gran Premio Città di Camaiore.

In June 2005, Rumšas was arrested before his trial by the Bonneville court. In January 2006, he and his wife received four-month suspended prison sentences for the import of prohibited doping substances. Polish doctor Krzysztof Ficek was handed a 12-month suspended sentence for prescribing the drugs.

Major results

1992
 2nd Overall Tour de Pologne
1st Stage 3 
1994
 1st  Overall Course de Solidarność et des Champions Olympiques
1996
 3rd Overall Course de Solidarność et des Champions Olympiques
1st Stage 3 
 9th Overall Tour de Pologne
 9th Route Adélie de Vitré
1997
 4th Overall Course de Solidarność et des Champions Olympiques
1st Stage 5
 9th Grote Prijs Jef Scherens
1998
 National Road Championships
2nd Road race
3rd Time trial
 2nd Overall Hessen Rundfahrt
1st Stage 4
 4th Overall Course de Solidarność et des Champions Olympiques
 5th Overall Tour de Pologne
 7th Overall Peace Race
1st Stages 1 & 4 
 7th Lancaster Classic
 9th Road race, UCI Road World Road Championships
1999
 National Road Championships
1st  Time trial
4th Road race
 1st Stage 5 Circuit des Mines
 2nd Overall Peace Race
1st Stage 3 
 3rd Overall Giro della Provincia di Lucca
 4th Overall Tour de Pologne
1st Stages 6 & 7 
 5th Overall PruTour
1st Stage 4 
2000 
 1st Giro di Lombardia
 2nd Coppa Bernocchi
 4th Overall Vuelta a Burgos
 5th Overall Vuelta a España
 5th Gran Premio Città di Camaiore
 9th Overall Tour de Romandie
2001 
 National Road Championships
1st  Road race
3rd Time trial
 1st  Overall Tour of the Basque Country
1st Stage 5b (ITT)
 2nd Overall Paris–Nice
 2nd Giro dell'Appennino
 3rd Overall Giro del Trentino
 3rd Overall Route du Sud
 3rd Gran Premio di Chiasso
 6th Liège–Bastogne–Liège
 7th Overall Settimana Internazionale di Coppi e Bartali
 9th Trofeo Laigueglia
2002
 2nd Overall Bicicleta Vasca
 3rd Overall Tour de France
2003 
 1st Stage 1b (TTT) Settimana Internazionale di Coppi e Bartali
  6th Overall Giro d'Italia 
2005
 National Road Championships
1st  Time trial
2nd Road race
2006
 National Road Championships
2nd Road race
2nd Time trial

Grand Tour General classification results timeline

References

External links

1972 births
Living people
Doping cases in cycling
Lithuanian male cyclists
Lithuanian sportspeople in doping cases
Cyclists at the 1996 Summer Olympics
Olympic cyclists of Lithuania
People from Šilutė
Lithuanian Sportsperson of the Year winners